The 2017 William & Mary Tribe football team represented the College of William & Mary as a member of the Colonial Athletic Association (CAA) in the 2017 NCAA Division I FCS football season. The Tribe were led by 38th-year head coach Jimmye Laycock played their home games at Zable Stadium. They finished the season 2–9 overall and 0–8 in CAA play to place last of out of 12 teams. It was the first time since the 1956 season in which William & Mary failed to win a single conference game.

Schedule

Game summaries

at Virginia

at Norfolk State

Bucknell

Stony Brook

at Elon

at Delaware

James Madison

at Maine

New Hampshire

Towson

at Richmond

References

William and Mary Tribe
William & Mary Tribe football seasons
William and Mary Tribe football